The tawny-crowned greenlet (Tunchiornis ochraceiceps) is a species of bird in the family Vireonidae and is the only species placed in the genus Tunchiornis. It is found in Belize, Bolivia, Brazil, Colombia, Costa Rica, Ecuador, French Guiana, Guatemala, Guyana, Honduras, Mexico, Nicaragua, Panama, Peru, Suriname, and Venezuela. Its natural habitat is subtropical or tropical moist lowland forest.

Taxonomy
The tawny-crowned greenlet was formally described in 1860 by the English zoologist Philip Sclater. The specimen had been collected in the state of Oaxaca of southwest Mexico by the French ornithologist Adolphe Boucard. Sclater coined the binomial name Hylophilus ochraceiceps. The specific name combines the Modern Latin ochraceus  meaning "ochraceous" with -ceps meaning "-capped". The species is now placed in the monotypic genus Tunchiornis that was introduced in 2014.

Ten subspecies are recognised:

 T. o. ochraceiceps (Sclater, PL, 1860) – south Mexico, Belize and north Guatemala
 T. o. pallidipectus (Ridgway, 1903) – south Guatemala and Honduras to northwest Panama
 T. o. pacificus (Parkes, 1991) – southeast Costa Rica and west Panama
 T. o. nelsoni (Todd, 1929) – east Panama
 T. o. bulunensis (Hartert, E, 1902) – extreme east Panama, west Colombia and northwest Ecuador
 T. o. ferrugineifrons (Sclater, PL, 1862) – southeast Colombia, south Venezuela, west-central Guyana, northwest Brazil, Ecuador and Peru
 T. o. viridior (Todd, 1929) – south Peru and north Bolivia
 T. o. luteifrons (Sclater, PL, 1881) – east Venezuela, the Guianas and north Brazil
 T. o. lutescens (Snethlage, E, 1914) – north-central Brazil south of the Amazon
 T. o. rubrifrons'' (Sclater, PL & Salvin, 1867) – northeast Brazil south of the Amazon

References

Further reading

tawny-crowned greenlet
Birds of Central America
Birds of the Tumbes-Chocó-Magdalena
Birds of the Amazon Basin
tawny-crowned greenlet
tawny-crowned greenlet
Taxonomy articles created by Polbot